Ben Williams (born December 28, 1984, Washington, D.C.) is an American jazz bassist.

Biography
Ben Williams began playing bass at age 10, was raised in the District of Columbia, and graduated from Duke Ellington School of the Arts. He received a Bachelor of Arts in Music Education from Michigan State University and a Master of Music in Jazz Studies at the Juilliard School.

In 2009, he won the prestigious Thelonious Monk International Jazz Bass Competition as judged by Ron Carter, Charlie Haden, Dave Holland, Robert Hurst, Christian McBride, and John Patitucci. The honor included a recording contract with Concord Records through which he released his debut album, State of Art, in 2011, featuring saxophonist Marcus Strickland, guitarist Matthew Stevens, pianist Gerald Clayton, drummer Jamire Williams, and percussionist Etienne Charles. His album Coming of Age, was released in April 2015 featuring sidemen Marcus Strickland on tenor and soprano saxophones, Matthew Stevens on electric guitar, Christian Sands on piano, and John Davis on drums.

In August 2020, Williams contributed to the live streamed recording of the singer Bilal's EP VOYAGE-19, created remotely during the COVID-19 lockdowns. It was released the following month with proceeds from its sales going to participating musicians in financial hardship from the pandemic.

Awards and honors
Williams was a member of guitarist Pat Metheny's Unity Band, which won Grammy Award for Best Jazz Instrumental Album for Unity Band in the 2013 Grammy.

Williams was introduced as one of the “25 for the Future” by DownBeat magazine in 2016.

Discography

As leader

As sideman

References

1984 births
Living people
American jazz double-bassists
Male double-bassists
Musicians from Washington, D.C.
Michigan State University alumni
Juilliard School alumni
21st-century double-bassists
21st-century American male musicians
American male jazz musicians